Rhodacantha is a genus of mites in the family Laelapidae.

Species
 Rhodacantha nelsoni R. Domrow, 1979     
 Rhodacantha tenax Domrow, 1979

References

Laelapidae